Daryino is a rural locality (a village) in Beloozersky Selsoviet, Gafuriysky District, Bashkortostan, Russia. The population was 250 as of 2010. There are 2 streets.

Geography 
Daryino is located 29 km northwest of Krasnousolsky (the district's administrative centre) by road. Beloye Ozero is the nearest rural locality.

References 

Rural localities in Gafuriysky District